Bayard Heston "Bud" Sharpe (1881-1916) was a Major League Baseball first baseman/outfielder. He played Major League baseball in parts of two seasons – 1905 and 1910.

Sharpe was born on August 6, 1881 in West Chester, Pennsylvania. He batted left-handed and threw right-handed, and his height and weight are unknown. Sharpe chose to attend Penn State University.

On April 14, 1905, at the age of 23, Sharpe made his big league debut with the Boston Beaneaters. In 46 games that year, he batted .182 in 170 at-bats.

The next chance Sharpe got to play in the big leagues was with the Pittsburgh Pirates in 1910. He played only four games with them that year before being traded to the Boston Doves on April 28 with Sam Frock for Kirby White. With both teams in 1910, Sharpe hit a combined .237 in 119 games.

On the diamond, Sharpe committed 23 career errors for a .983 fielding percentage.

Sharpe played his final big league game on September 24, 1910. He died from a heart attack on May 31, 1916 in Haddock, Georgia at the age of 34. His body was buried in Greenmount Cemetery in the place of his birth, West Chester, Pennsylvania.

Sharpe was also a noted soccer player, spending time with a local team in West Chester during the baseball off-seasons.

Sources

References 

Boston Beaneaters players
Pittsburgh Pirates players
Boston Doves players
Major League Baseball first basemen
Baseball players from Pennsylvania
People from West Chester, Pennsylvania
1881 births
1916 deaths
Pennsylvania State University alumni
Penn State Nittany Lions baseball players
Scranton Miners players
Newark Sailors players
Newark Indians players
Buffalo Bisons (minor league) players
Oakland Oaks (baseball) players
Oakland Oaks (baseball) managers
American soccer players
Association footballers not categorized by position
Sportspeople from Chester County, Pennsylvania
Shamokin (minor league baseball) players